A 6.6 magnitude earthquake struck the island province of Masbate in the Philippines on August 18, 2020, leaving at least 2 dead and 170 injured.

Earthquake 
The Philippine Institute of Volcanology and Seismology (PHIVOLCS) initially reported a magnitude 6.5 earthquake striking at 8:03am Philippine Standard Time (PST) in Cataingan, Masbate. The report was later revised to a magnitude 6.6 earthquake. The earthquake was also felt in several parts of Luzon and the Visayas. The fault from which the earthquake originated is the Masbate segment of the Philippine Fault System.

Damage 
Several houses and buildings in Cataingan, Masbate collapsed due to the earthquake, including a three-story building, its old and new public market, a police station, and the docking area of Cataingan Port. Several roads and buildings throughout Masbate were also damaged according to the Office of Civil Defense of the Bicol Region. Power lines were also toppled down in the province, resulting in an unscheduled power interruption.

Casualties 
At least 170 people were injured, while 2 were confirmed dead; one retired policeman died after getting trapped when his house collapsed in Cataingan and one had a heart attack.

See also
List of earthquakes in 2020
List of earthquakes in the Philippines

References

External links 
 

2020 disasters in the Philippines
2020 earthquakes
August 2020 events in the Philippines
Earthquakes in the Philippines